The 2021 Czech Athletics Championships was the 52nd edition of the national championship in outdoor track and field for athletes in Czech Republic. It was held between 26 and 27 June at the Stadion Mládeže in Zlín.

Results

Men

Women

References

External links 
Czech Athletics Federation website 

Czech Athletics Championships
Czech Athletics Championships
Czech Athletics Championships
Czech Athletics Championships
Sport in Zlín